Rev II was a prince of Iberia of the Chosroid Dynasty (natively known as Kartli, eastern Georgia) who functioned as a co-king to his father Mirian III, the first Christian Georgian ruler and his mother was Nana of Iberia. Professor Cyril Toumanoff suggests the years 345–361 as the period of their joint reign.

According to the medieval Georgian chronicles, Rev had an appanage at Ujarma in the eastern province of Kakheti. He married Salome, daughter of King Tiridates III of Armenia and his wife, Queen Ashkhen. Salome played a role in the conversion of Iberia c. 337. Rev died before his father and probably in the same year as he. Rev's purported first son Saurmag, unknown to the Georgian historical tradition, then succeeded Mirian in 361. His second son, Trdat, known from the Georgian chronicles, reigned in Iberia from c. 394 to 406.

References

Chosroid kings of Iberia
4th-century monarchs in Asia
4th-century monarchs in Europe
Georgians from the Sasanian Empire